Paul Goble could refer to: 

Paul Goble (writer and illustrator) (1933–2017), British-American children's author
Paul A. Goble (born 1949), American scholar of Russian studies

See also
Paul Goebel (disambiguation)
Paul Gobeil (born 1942), Canadian businessman and politician